The Steeple is a small Mountain in the Ardgoil Peninsula and Arrochar Alps behind the village of Lochgoilhead within Loch Lomond and the Trossachs National Park. The peak reaches a height of 378m.

Mountains and hills of Argyll and Bute